Delta 4 or variant may refer to:

 Delta 4 (developer) defunct British software developer
 Delta IV (rocket) U.S. spacelaunch spacerocket
 Delta-class submarine including the Delta-IV subclass
 Delta IV oil field in the Black Sea
 Lippisch Delta IV, German experimental aircraft designed by Alexander Lippisch

See also
 Delta (disambiguation)
 Four (disambiguation)
 IV (disambiguation)

Disambiguation pages